The 1993 All-Ireland Senior Camogie Championship Final was the 62nd All-Ireland Final and the deciding match of the 1993 All-Ireland Senior Camogie Championship, an inter-county camogie tournament for the top teams in Ireland.

Cork led 1-7 to 1-5 at half-time and their superior experience showed in the end. The Downey sisters got 1-9 between them.

References

All-Ireland Senior Camogie Championship Final
All-Ireland Senior Camogie Championship Final
All-Ireland Senior Camogie Championship Final, 1993
All-Ireland Senior Camogie Championship Finals
Cork county camogie team matches